Sergey Kruglov (born 24 February 1960) is a Russian bobsledder. He competed at the 1992 Winter Olympics, representing the Unified Team, and the 1994 Winter Olympics, representing Russia.

References

1960 births
Living people
Russian male bobsledders
Olympic bobsledders of the Unified Team
Olympic bobsledders of Russia
Bobsledders at the 1992 Winter Olympics
Bobsledders at the 1994 Winter Olympics
Place of birth missing (living people)